Buckingham Park (formerly Buckingham Peninsula) is an unincorporated community in Lake County, California.

The name comes from a family that lived at the site in the 1880s and 1890s.

References

Unincorporated communities in California
Unincorporated communities in Lake County, California